Karakol (Kara-Kool) is a rural locality (a selo) in Ust-Kansky District, the Altai Republic, Russia. The population was 151 as of 2016. There are 3 streets.

Geography 
Karakol is located 77 km north of Ust-Kan (the district's administrative centre) by road. Chyorny Anuy is the nearest rural locality.

References 

Rural localities in Ust-Kansky District